Quigley is a surname of Irish origin derived from the Gaelic Ó Coigligh meaning "descendant of Coigleach (male)" or Ní Choigligh meaning "descendant of Coigleach (female)."

Variations include: O'Quigley, Cogley, Quigly, Quigg, Quickley, MacQuigg, McQuigge, O'Quigg, Twigg and Fivey.

The name may refer to:

Allie Quigley, American basketball player
Brett Quigley (born 1969), American golfer
Carroll Quigley (1910–1977), American writer and history professor
Colleen Quigley (born 1992), American distance runner and Olympian
Dana Quigley (born 1947), American golfer
Dawn Quigley, Ojibwe-American author and educator
Dennis Quigley (1913–1984), Scottish footballer
Derek Quigley (born 1932), New Zealand politician
Eddie Quigley (1921–1997), English footballer and manager
Ernie Quigley (1880–1960), Canadian-American sports official
Fannie Quigley (1870–1944), Alaskan pioneer and prospector
James Edward Quigley (1854–1915), Canadian-American archbishop
James F. Quigley (1859-1935), Irish-American politician, judge and lawyer
Jane Quigley (born 1939), American actress
Jez Quigley, a character on the British soap opera Coronation Street
Joe Quigley (born 1996), English footballer
Joe Quigley (born 1961), Australian hammer thrower
Joan Quigley (1927–2014), American astrologer
Joan M. Quigley (born 1940), American politician
John Quigley (disambiguation), several people
Johnny Quigley (1935–2004), Scottish footballer
Joy Quigley (born 1948), New Zealand politician
Linnea Quigley (born 1958), American B-movie actress
Madison Quigley, main character in the book La fabuleuse histoire de Madison Quigley
Maggie Quigley (born 1979), American actress
Martin Quigley (born 1951), Irish hurler
Martin Quigley (1890–1964), a publisher and journalist
Martin Quigley, Jr. (1917–2011), publisher, author and politician
Mary Quigley (1960–1977), American murder victim
Matthew Quigley, fictional character in the film Quigley Down Under
Michael Quigley (born 1958), American politician
Mike Quigley (born 1970), English footballer
Raymond L. Quigley (1885–1958), American college baseball coach
Richard Quigley (born 1990), American poet
Ryan Quigley (born 1990), American football punter
Sarah Quigley (born 1967), New Zealand author
Sheila Quigley (born 1948?), English novelist
Thomas J. Quigley (1905–1960), American school superintendent
William P. Quigley, law professor and research director at Loyola University New Orleans
Leanne Quigley, irish actor

Surnames of Irish origin
Anglicised Irish-language surnames